The Westmorland Geological Society is a body based in the Lake District region of the UK that aims to engage all those interested in geology, particularly in the southern Lakes.

The Society was founded in 1973 and continues to hold a programme of lectures during the winter in Kendal and summer field excursions, looking at the field geology of the Lake District and beyond.

External links
Westmorland Geological Society website

See also
Geology of the United Kingdom

Scientific societies based in the United Kingdom
Scientific organizations established in 1973
Geology societies
1973 establishments in England
Lake District